Eya Dan Loku Lamayek (How to Be an Adult) is a 1975 Sri Lankan drama film directed by Dharmasena Pathiraja. It was entered into the 9th Moscow International Film Festival.

Cast
 Malini Fonseka as Katuwalagedera 'Susila' Susilawathie 'Susee'
 Vijaya Kumaratunga as Ratnayake Arachilage Ratnayake 'Ralahamy'
 Shanthi Lekha as Susila's Amma
 Wimal Kumara de Costa as Siripala
 Nishanka Diddeniya as Podi 'Malli'
 Ananda Fonseka as Loku 'Malli'
 Hilda Agnes as Lizzy 'Nona'
 Sriyani Perera as Manel
 Piyasena Ahangama as English Mahathaya
 Daya Thennakoon as Lustful temple worker
 Vincent Vaas as Vigilante leader
 Eddie Jayamanne as Mama
 Cyril Wickramage as Fighting card dealer
 Somasiri Dehipitiya as Bootlegger
 Gamini Ganegoda as School trip teacher
 Piyasili Dias as Susee's aunt
 U. Ariyawimal as Second Ralahamy
 Miyuri Samarasinghe as School trip teacher
 Agnes Sirisena as Susee's Relative

References

External links
 

1975 films
1975 drama films
Sri Lankan black-and-white films
1970s Sinhala-language films
Sri Lankan drama films